Ascotis is a genus of moths in the family Geometridae erected by Jacob Hübner in 1825.

Selected species
 Ascotis antelmaria (Mabille, 1893)
 Ascotis glaucotoxa (Prout, 1927)
 Ascotis fortunata (Blachier, 1887)
 Ascotis margarita Warren, 1894
 Ascotis reciprocaria (Walker, 1860)
 Ascotis selenaria (Denis & Schiffermüller, 1775) – giant looper – type species
 Ascotis sordida Warren, 1894
 Ascotis terebraria Guénée, 1862

References

Boarmiini
Geometridae genera